Terje Aasland (born 15 February 1965, in Skien) is a Norwegian politician for the Labour Party. He has served as minister of petroleum and energy since 2022. He has also been an MP for Telemark since 2005.

Education
Aasland is an educated electrician. He spent parts of his professional career in trade unions.

Political career

Local politics
On the local level, Aasland held various positions in Skien municipality council from 1991 to 2003. He chaired the local party chapter from 1995 to 2000, and was the deputy leader of the county chapter from 1998 to 2000. During the same period he was a member of the Labour Party national board.

Parliament
He was elected to the Norwegian Parliament from Telemark in 2005 and has been re-elected since. 

Aasland was first vice chair of the Standing Committee on Energy and the Environment from 2013 to 2017. He also served as the chair of the Standing Committee on Business and Industry from 2009 to 2013. He then served as second vice chair of the Standing Committee on Business and Industry from 2017 to 2021, and as the chair of the Standing Committee on Energy and the Environment from 2021 to 2022. 

After his party won the 2021 election, Aasland was appointed deputy parliamentary leader.

In February 2022, Aasland opened for the use of ocean wind to electrify the Norwegian shelf. He said: "I believe that the development of offshore wind can happen faster than people think, and that it can be a win-win situation for Norway".

Minister of Petroleum and Energy

2022
Following Hadia Tajik's resignation after controversy regarding the use of a government apartment and fringe benefit; Marte Mjøs Persen was appointed her successor on 7 March 2022. Aasland was appointed Persen's successor.

On 23 March, Aasland attended a seminar held by Energy Valley in Fornebu. There he announced the government's intention to set "qualitative criteria" for floating offshore wind and not just look at which bidder can give the best bid financially. To E24, he elaborated: "This means that we will set some criteria and we will evaluate the industry's projects against when we will allocate areas".

On 5 April, he announced that exploration permits had been granted for areas in the North and Barents Sea. The respective permits were given to Equinor for the North Sea, and two sub companies for Equinor, Horisont Energi AS and Vår Energi AS, for the Barents Sea. Aasland stated: "Capturing and storing CO2 is necessary for the world to achieve its ambitious climate goals. In Norway, we have extensive experience with storing CO2 from the Sleipner and Snøhvit fields, and we know that it works. The Government will facilitate the Norwegian continental shelf to retain a leading role in this area".

During a debate on Debatten on 19 April, Aasland was asked by host Fredrik Solvang  if he agreed with his predecessor's statement about it being "unfortunate to place restrictions on the export of electricity and Norwegian hydropower". Aasland refused to answer the question, and referred to that the government would have a look at the power situation. He notably said that he couldn't reply to what Mjøs Persen had said months ago.

On 10 June, he announced that the government would be giving two exploration permits for storing C02, stating: "Two exploration permits have now been granted for CO2 storage.  The allocation of these exploration permits will be an important contribution both to facilitating a new commercial industry and new profitable industrial activity that requires CO2 storage. These awards will strengthen the development of this important climate measure".

On 6 July, Aasland stated that he wouldn't rule out rationing and limiting electricity imports if the power shortages worsened. He specified that these measures would be more relevant for companies, but wouldn't rule out it effecting the general population.

After continuous pressure from the opposition parties and the government parties, the government announced new measures to tackle the electricity costs on 7 August. This included restrictions on exports regarding low degrees of filling. Aasland stated: "We want to be clear that people do not have to fear a lack of electricity for their homes during the winter. Unfortunately, we see that prices are likely to be even higher in the future than previous estimates". He also emphasised that the electricity supply was better than weeks prior.

In response to a question from Progress Party MP Marius Arion Nilsen on 2 September; Aasland stated that there hadn't been any new estimates of how much the electricity bill would effect individual households as a consequence of electrifying the petroleum shelves since 2020. Nilsen in turn called it "irresponsible" of the government to go ahead with electrifying the shelves without estimating the effects of electricity prices.

In October, after President of the European Commission Ursula von der Leyen expressed interest in negotiating with Norway over price corridors for gas, Aasland rejected the idea. He asserted that the Norwegian government didn't sell the gas, but the companies did, and they followed the terms of the market. He did however affirm that Norway was in dialogue with the European Union about stabilising the energy markets.

The EU proposed a price corridor for gas in November, which Aasland warned against. He instead proposed more market based solutions. He also expressed understanding for it being proposed, in order to ease the tension in the energy market.

In mid-December, Aasland admitted that the government hadn't found any immediate solutions to the high electricity prices. He did however express hope that the Energy Commission that the government had put down, would be able to find long term solutions and other short term solutions as well.

2023
In January 2023, Aasland criticised his fellow cabinet colleague Ola Borten Moe after he criticised his own government's hydrogen investments. Aasland expressed that Borten Moe had misunderstood the government's intentions and made miscalculations.

In February, prime minister Jonas Gahr Støre, accompanied by Aasland and finance minister Trygve Slagsvold Vedum, announced that the electricity support scheme would be expanded until 2024. Aasland specified that a 50% increase in the scheme from September and November 2022 would not be affected by the new iteration. He also stated that said change would come into effect on 1 September 2023.

On 2 March, after a crisis meeting with agriculture minister Sandra Borch, President of the Norwegian Sami Parliament Silje Karine Muotka regarding the Fosen wind farms, Aasland apologised to the Sami people on behalf of the government and recognised that human rights had been violated. This came in response to mass protests against the violation, which the Norwegian Supreme Court had ruled on 11 October 2021. Despite this, the protestors indicated that they would continue protesting the day after.

Personal life
Aasland is married and has three children.

References

External links

1965 births
Living people
Members of the Storting
Politicians from Telemark
Labour Party (Norway) politicians
Norwegian trade unionists
Politicians from Skien
Petroleum and energy ministers of Norway
21st-century Norwegian politicians